Don Juan is a legendary fictional libertine.

Don Juan may also refer to:

Persons
 John, Prince of Asturias (1478–1497), son of Queen Isabella I of Castile and King Ferdinand II of Aragon
 John, Prince of Girona (1509), son of King Ferdinand II of Aragon and Queen Germaine of Foix, died in infancy
 Don Juan Manuel (1282–1348), Castilian writer
 John of Austria (1547–1578), Don Juan de Austria, European admiral and general
 John of Austria the Younger (1629–1679), Don Juan de Austria the Younger, Prime Minister of Spain from 1677 to 1679
 Don "Magic" Juan (born 1950), American rapper
 Juan Carlos I of Spain (born 1938), king and head of state of Spain
 Juan de Borbón, Count of Barcelona (1913–1993), pretender

Places
 Don Juan, Dominican Republic, a town
 Don Juan Pond, a lake in Antarctica

Works inspired by Don Juan
See also .

Books
 El estudiante de Salamanca, a poem by José de Espronceda
 Don Juan (poem), a satiric narrative poem by Lord Byron
 Ibong Adarna (mythology), Philippine mythological story
 Don Juan, a short story by E. T. A. Hoffmann

Plays
 Don Juan (drama), a 1862 play by Aleksey Konstantinovich Tolstoy
 The Trickster of Seville and the Stone Guest, a ca. 1630 play by Tirso de Molina
 Don Juan Tenorio, an 1844 play by José Zorilla
 Dom Juan, a 1665 play by Molière
 Don Juan (Brecht), an adaptation of the play by Bertolt Brecht
 Don Juan in Hell, excerpt of George Bernard Shaw's Man and Superman

Films and TV
 Don Juan (1913 film), a Dutch silent film directed by Léon Boedels
 Don Juan (1922 film), a German silent film directed by Albert Heine and Robert Land
 Don Juan (1926 film), an American Vitaphone film starring John Barrymore
 The Private Life of Don Juan, a 1934 British film starring Douglas Fairbanks, Merle Oberon and Benita Hume
 Adventures of Don Juan, a 1948 American film starring Errol Flynn
 Don Juan (1950 film), a Spanish film starring Antonio Vilar. Annabella and María Rosa Salgado
 Don Juan (1955 film), an Austrian musical film directed by Walter Kolm-Veltée
 Don Juan (1956 film), a French-Italian-Spanish comedy film directed by John Berry
 Don Juan (1969 film), a Czechoslovak short film written and directed by Jan Švankmajer
 Don Juan, or If Don Juan Were a Woman, a 1973 French-Italian film with Brigitte Bardot
 Don Juan (1998 film), a film written and directed by Jacques Weber
 Don Juan DeMarco, a 1995 American film starring Johnny Depp
 The Don Juans, a 2013 Czech comedy film directed by Jiří Menzel

Music
 Don Juan (ballet), a ballet by Ranieri de' Calzabigi, Christoph Willibald Gluck and Gasparo Angiolini
 Don Juan (musical), a 2004 musical by Félix Gary, revived in 2012
 Don Juan (Strauss), a 1888 tone poem by Richard Strauss
 Don Juan Triumphant, a fictional opera within Andrew Lloyd Webber's The Phantom of the Opera
 Réminiscences de Don Juan, an operatic fantasy by Franz Liszt
 "Don Juan" (Dave Dee, Dozy, Beaky, Mick & Tich song), 1969
 "Don Juan" (Fanny Lu song) a song by Fanny Lu from the album Felicidad y Perpetua
 "Don Juan" (Ernesto Ponzio song)
 "Don Juan", a song by Pet Shop Boys from the album Alternative
 "Don Juan", a song by Suburban Legends from their self-titled EP
 The Don Juans (band), American folk music duo

Other uses
 Don Juan (horse), an Australian racehorse
 Donjuan (magazine), a Colombian lads' mag
 Don Juan Matus, medicine man from Sonora, Mexico, featured in books by Carlos Castaneda
 Don Juan, another name for a pickup artist, after the character

See also
 Don Juanism, non-clinical term for the desire, in a man, to have sex with many different female partners
 Don John (disambiguation), a similar name